Raphitoma fischeri is an extinct species of sea snail, a marine gastropod mollusc in the family Raphitomidae.

Description

Distribution
Fossils of this extinct marine species were found in Eocene strata in France.

References

 Cossmann (M.) & Pissarro (G.), 1913 Iconographie complète des coquilles fossiles de l'Éocène des environs de Paris, t. 2, p. pl. 46-65

fischeri
Gastropods described in 1902